Gone in 60 Seconds is the soundtrack to the 2000 action film, Gone in 60 Seconds. It was released on June 6, 2000 through Island Records and consisted of a blend of alternative rock, electronic and hip hop music. The album managed to make it to #69 on the Billboard 200 and #25 on the Top Soundtracks. The song "Painted on My Heart" was also released as a single.

Track listing
"Painted on My Heart" - 4:27 (The Cult) 
"Machismo" - 3:36 (Gomez) 
"Flower" - 3:25 (Moby) 
"Rap" - 4:15 (Groove Armada) 
"Leave Home" - 5:13 (The Chemical Brothers) 
"Da Rockwilder" - 2:20 (Method Man & Redman)
"Roll All Day" - 3:15 (Ice Cube)  
"Sugarless" - 3:07 (Caviar) 
"Never Gonna Come Back Down" - 3:47 (BT feat. Mike Doughty)
"Too Sick to Pray" - 4:46 (Alabama 3)  
"Party Up (Up in Here)" - 4:32 (DMX) 
"Stop the Rock" - 3:33 (Apollo 440) 
"Better Days (And the Bottom Drops Out)" - 6:25 (Citizen King)  
"Boost Me" - 2:49 (Trevor Rabin)

The following tracks were included in the movie's credits but omitted in the soundtrack:
"Busy Child" - 7:23 (The Crystal Method)
"Low Rider" - 3:13 (War)
"Been Caught Stealing" - 3:34 (Jane's Addiction)
"Ride On Josephine" - 4:26 (George Thorogood & The Destroyers)
"If Everybody Looked The Same" - 3:36 (Groove Armada)
"You Won't Fall" - (Lori Carson)
"Folsom Prison Blues" - (Johnny Cash)
"Shine On Me" - (Torch Song)
"Brick House" - (The Commodores)

Charts

References

Action film soundtracks
Hip hop soundtracks
2000 soundtrack albums
2000s film soundtrack albums
Alternative rock soundtracks
Electronic soundtracks
Crime film soundtracks
Island Records soundtracks